Crassatella is a genus of  saltwater clams, marine bivalve molluscs of the order Carditida.

Species
 Crassatella aequatorialis (Jaeckel & Thiele, 1931)
 Crassatella brasiliensis (Dall, 1903)
 Crassatella capensis Lamy, 1917
 Crassatella crebrilirata G. B. Sowerby II, 1870
 † Crassatella duplex Berezovsky, 2004
 † Crassatella gibbosula Lamarck, 1805 
 Crassatella gilchristi G. B. Sowerby III, 1904
 † Crassatella hellica d'Orbigny, 1850 
 Crassatella knockeri E. A. Smith, 1881
 † Crassatella landinensis Nyst, 1845 
 † Crassatella lassa Berezovsky, 2022 
 † Crassatella minor Deshayes, 1860 
 † Crassatella necopina Berezovsky, 2018 
 Crassatella pallida A. Adams & Reeve, 1850
 † Crassatella parisiensis d'Orbigny, 1850 
 † Crassatella personata Berezovsky, 2018 
 † Crassatella ponderosa (Gmelin, 1791) 
 † Crassatella salsensis d’Archiac, 1854 
 † Crassatella scutellaria Deshayes, 1824 
 † Crassatella singulata Berezovsky, 2018 
 † Crassatella sinuosa Deshayes, 1824 
 † Crassatella sowerbyi S.V. Wood, 1871 
 Crassatella subquadrata G. B. Sowerby II, 1870
 † Crassatella thallavignesi Deshayes, 1857 
 Crassatella uruguayensis E. A. Smith, 1880

References

External links
 Lamarck, J.B.M. (1799). Prodrome d'une nouvelle classification des coquilles, comprenant une rédaction appropriée des caractères géneriques, et l'établissement d'un grand nombre de genres nouveaux. Mémoires de la Société d'Histoire Naturelle de Paris. 1: 63-91

Crassatellidae
Bivalve genera